

Events

Pre-1600
 474 – Seven-year-old Leo II succeeds his maternal grandfather Leo I as Byzantine emperor. He dies ten months later.
 532 – Nika riots in Constantinople fail.
1126 – Emperor Huizong abdicates the Chinese throne in favour of his son Emperor Qinzong.
1486 – King Henry VII of England marries Elizabeth of York, daughter of Edward IV, uniting the House of Lancaster and the House of York.
1562 – Pope Pius IV reopens the Council of Trent for its third and final session.
1586 – The magnitude 7.9 Tenshō earthquake strikes Honshu, Japan, killing 8,000 people and triggering a tsunami.

1601–1900
1670 – Henry Morgan captures Panama.
1701 – Frederick I crowns himself King of Prussia in Königsberg.
1778 – James Cook is the first known European to discover the Hawaiian Islands, which he names the "Sandwich Islands".
1788 – The first elements of the First Fleet carrying 736 convicts from Great Britain to Australia arrive at Botany Bay.
1806 – Jan Willem Janssens surrenders the Dutch Cape Colony to the British.
1866 – Wesley College is established in Melbourne, Australia.
1871 – Wilhelm I of Germany is proclaimed Kaiser Wilhelm in the Hall of Mirrors of the Palace of Versailles (France) towards the end of the Franco-Prussian War. Wilhelm already had the title of German Emperor since the constitution of 1 January 1871, but he had hesitated to accept the title.
1886 – Modern field hockey is born with the formation of The Hockey Association in England.
1896 – An X-ray generating machine is exhibited for the first time by H. L. Smith.

1901–present
1911 – Eugene B. Ely lands on the deck of the  anchored in San Francisco Bay, the first time an aircraft landed on a ship.
1913 – First Balkan War: A Greek flotilla defeats the Ottoman Navy in the Naval Battle of Lemnos, securing the islands of the Northern Aegean Sea for Greece.
1915 – Japan issues the "Twenty-One Demands" to the Republic of China in a bid to increase its power in East Asia.
1919 – World War I: The Paris Peace Conference opens in Versailles, France.
  1919   – Ignacy Jan Paderewski becomes Prime Minister of the newly independent Poland.
1941 – World War II: British troops launch a general counter-offensive against Italian East Africa.
1943 – Warsaw Ghetto Uprising: The first uprising of Jews in the Warsaw Ghetto.
1945 – World War II: Liberation of Kraków, Poland by the Red Army.
1958 – Willie O'Ree, the first Black Canadian National Hockey League player, makes his NHL debut with the Boston Bruins.
1960 – Capital Airlines Flight 20 crashes into a farm in Charles City County, Virginia, killing all 50 aboard, the third fatal Capital Airlines crash in as many years.
1967 – Albert DeSalvo, the "Boston Strangler", is convicted of numerous crimes and is sentenced to life imprisonment.
1969 – United Airlines Flight 266 crashes into Santa Monica Bay killing all 32 passengers and six crew members.
1972 – Members of the Mukti Bahini lay down their arms to the government of the newly independent Bangladesh, a month after winning the war against the occupying Pakistan Army.
1974 – A Disengagement of Forces agreement is signed between the Israeli and Egyptian governments, ending conflict on the Egyptian front of the Yom Kippur War.
1976 – Lebanese Christian militias kill at least 1,000 in Karantina, Beirut.
1977 – Scientists identify a previously unknown bacterium as the cause of the mysterious Legionnaires' disease.
  1977   – Australia's worst rail disaster occurs at Granville, Sydney, killing 83.
  1977   – SFR Yugoslavia's Prime minister, Džemal Bijedić, his wife and six others are killed in a plane crash in Bosnia and Herzegovina.
1978 – The European Court of Human Rights finds the United Kingdom's government guilty of mistreating prisoners in Northern Ireland, but not guilty of torture.
1981 – Phil Smith and Phil Mayfield parachute off a Houston skyscraper, becoming the first two people to BASE jump from objects in all four categories: buildings, antennae, spans (bridges), and earth (cliffs).
1983 – The International Olympic Committee restores Jim Thorpe's Olympic medals to his family.
1988 – China Southwest Airlines Flight 4146 crashes near Chongqing Jiangbei International Airport, killing all 98 passengers and 10 crew members.
1990 – Washington, D.C. Mayor Marion Barry is arrested for drug possession in an FBI sting.
1993 – Martin Luther King, Jr. Day is officially observed for the first time in all 50 US states.
2002 – The Sierra Leone Civil War is declared over.
2003 – A bushfire kills four people and destroys more than 500 homes in Canberra, Australia.
2005 – The Airbus A380, the world's largest commercial jet, is unveiled at a ceremony in Toulouse, France
2007 – The strongest storm in the United Kingdom in 17 years kills 14 people and Germany sees the worst storm since 1999 with 13 deaths. Cyclone Kyrill causes at least 44 deaths across 20 countries in Western Europe.
2008 – The Euphronios Krater is unveiled in Rome after being returned to Italy by the Metropolitan Museum of Art.
2018 – A bus catches fire on the Samara–Shymkent road in Yrgyz District, Aktobe, Kazakhstan. The fire kills 52 passengers, with three passengers and two drivers escaping.
2019 – An oil pipeline explosion near Tlahuelilpan, Hidalgo, Mexico, kills 137 people.
2023 – A helicopter crash in Ukraine leaves 14 people dead, including the country's Interior Minister, Denys Monastyrsky.

Births

Pre-1600
1404 – Sir Philip Courtenay, English noble (d. 1463)
1457 – Antonio Trivulzio, seniore, Roman Catholic cardinal (d. 1508)
1519 – Isabella Jagiellon, Queen of Hungary (d. 1559)
1540 – Catherine, Duchess of Braganza (d. 1614)

1601–1900
1641 – François-Michel le Tellier, Marquis de Louvois, French politician, Secretary of State for War (d. 1691)
1659 – Damaris Cudworth Masham, English philosopher and theologian (d. 1708)
1672 – Antoine Houdar de la Motte, French author (d. 1731)
1688 – Lionel Sackville, 1st Duke of Dorset, English politician, Lord Lieutenant of Ireland (d. 1765)
1689 – Montesquieu, French lawyer and philosopher (d. 1755)
1701 – Johann Jakob Moser, German jurist (d. 1785)
1743 – Louis Claude de Saint-Martin, French mystic and philosopher (d. 1803)
1751 – Ferdinand Kauer, Austrian pianist and composer (d. 1831)
1752 – John Nash, English architect (d. 1835)
1764 – Samuel Whitbread, English politician (d. 1815)
1779 – Peter Mark Roget, English physician, lexicographer, and theologian (d. 1869)
1782 – Daniel Webster, American lawyer and politician, 14th United States Secretary of State (d. 1852)
1793 – Pratap Singh Bhosle, Chhatrapati of the Maratha Empire (d. 1847)
1815 – Constantin von Tischendorf, German theologian and scholar (d. 1874)
1835 – César Cui, Russian general, composer, and critic (d. 1918)
1840 – Henry Austin Dobson, English poet and author (d. 1921)
1841 – Emmanuel Chabrier, French pianist and composer (d. 1894)
1842 – A. A. Ames, American physician and politician, Mayor of Minneapolis (d. 1911)
1848 – Ioan Slavici, Romanian journalist and author (d. 1925)
1849 – Edmund Barton, Australian judge and politician, 1st Prime Minister of Australia (d. 1920)
1850 – Seth Low, American academic and politician, 92nd Mayor of New York City (d. 1916)
1853 – Marthinus Nikolaas Ras, South African farmer, soldier, and gun-maker (d. 1900)
1854 – Thomas A. Watson, American assistant to Alexander Graham Bell (d. 1934)
1856 – Daniel Hale Williams, American surgeon and cardiologist (d. 1931)
1867 – Rubén Darío, Nicaraguan poet, journalist, and diplomat (d. 1916)
1868 – Kantarō Suzuki, Japanese admiral and politician, 42nd Prime Minister of Japan (d. 1948)
1877 – Sam Zemurray, Russian-American businessman, founded the Cuyamel Fruit Company (d. 1961)
1879 – Henri Giraud, French general and politician (d. 1949)
1880 – Paul Ehrenfest, Austrian-Dutch physicist and academic (d. 1933)
  1880   – Alfredo Ildefonso Schuster, Italian cardinal (d. 1954)
1881 – Gaston Gallimard, French publisher, founded Éditions Gallimard (d. 1975)
1882 – A. A. Milne, English author, poet, and playwright (d. 1956)
1886 – Clara Nordström, Swedish-German author and translator (d. 1962)
1888 – Thomas Sopwith, English ice hockey player, sailor, and pilot (d. 1989)
1892 – Oliver Hardy, American actor and comedian (d. 1957)
  1892   – Bill Meanix, American hurdler and coach (d. 1957)
  1892   – Paul Rostock, German surgeon and academic (d. 1956)
1893 – Jorge Guillén, Spanish poet, critic, and academic (d. 1984)
1894 – Toots Mondt, American wrestler and promoter (d. 1976)
1896 – C. M. Eddy Jr., American author (d. 1967)
  1896   – Ville Ritola, Finnish-American runner (d. 1982)
1898 – Albert Kivikas, Estonian journalist and author (d. 1978)

1901–present 
1901 – Ivan Petrovsky, Russian mathematician and academic (d. 1973)
1903 – Berthold Goldschmidt, German pianist and composer (d. 1996)
1904 – Anthony Galla-Rini, American accordion player and composer (d. 2006)
  1904   – Cary Grant, English-American actor (d. 1986)
1905 – Joseph Bonanno, Italian-American mob boss (d. 2002)
1907 – János Ferencsik, Hungarian conductor (d. 1984)
1908 – Jacob Bronowski, Polish-English mathematician, historian, and television host (d. 1974)
1910 – Kenneth E. Boulding, English economist and academic (d. 1993)
1911 – José María Arguedas, Peruvian anthropologist, author, and poet (d. 1969)
  1911   – Danny Kaye, American actor, singer, and dancer (d. 1987)
1913 – Carroll Cloar, American artist (d. 1993)
  1913   – Giannis Papaioannou, Greek composer (d. 1972)
1914 – Arno Schmidt, German author and translator (d. 1979)
  1914   – Vitomil Zupan, Slovene author, poet, and playwright (d. 1987)
1915 – Syl Apps, Canadian pole vaulter, ice hockey player, and politician (d. 1998)
  1915   – Santiago Carrillo, Spanish soldier and politician (d. 2012)
  1915   – Vassilis Tsitsanis, Greek singer-songwriter and bouzouki player (d. 1984)
1917 – Nicholas Oresko, American sergeant, Medal of Honor recipient (d. 2013)
  1917   – Wang Yung-ching, Taiwanese-American businessman (d. 2008)
1918 – Gustave Gingras, Canadian-English physician and educator (d. 1996)
1919 – Toni Turek, German footballer (d. 1984)
1921 – Yoichiro Nambu, Japanese-American physicist and academic, Nobel Prize laureate (d. 2015)
1923 – John Graham, General Officer Commanding (GOC) Wales (d. 2012)
  1923   – Gerrit Voorting, Dutch cyclist (d. 2015)
1925 – Gilles Deleuze, French metaphysician and philosopher (d. 1995)
  1925   – John V. Evans, American soldier and politician, 27th Governor of Idaho (d. 2014)
  1925   – Sol Yurick, American soldier and author (d. 2013)
1926 – Randolph Bromery, American geologist and academic (d. 2013)
1927 – S. Balachander, Indian actor, singer, and veena player (d. 1990)
1928 – Alexander Gomelsky, Soviet and Russian professional basketball coach (d. 2005)
1931 – Chun Doo-hwan, South Korean general and politician, 5th President of South Korea (d. 2021)
1932 – Robert Anton Wilson, American psychologist, author, poet, and playwright (d. 2007)
1933 – Emeka Anyaoku, Nigerian politician, 8th Nigerian Minister of Foreign Affairs
  1933   – David Bellamy, English botanist, author and academic (d. 2019)
  1933   – John Boorman, English director, producer, and screenwriter
  1933   – Ray Dolby, American engineer and businessman, founded Dolby Laboratories (d. 2013)
  1933   – William Goodhart, Baron Goodhart, English lawyer and politician (d. 2017)
  1933   – Frank McMullen, New Zealand rugby player (d. 2004)
  1933   – Jean Vuarnet, French ski racer (d. 2017)
1934 – Raymond Briggs, English author and illustrator (d. 2022)
1935 – Albert Millaire, Canadian actor and director (d. 2018)
  1935   – Jon Stallworthy, English poet, critic, and academic (d. 2014)
  1935   – Gad Yaacobi, Israeli academic and diplomat, 10th Israel Ambassador to the United Nations (d. 2007)
1936 – David Howell, Baron Howell of Guildford, English journalist and politician, Secretary of State for Transport
1937 – John Hume, Northern Irish educator and politician, Nobel Prize laureate (d. 2020)
1938 – Curt Flood, American baseball player and sportscaster (d. 1997)
  1938   – Anthony Giddens, English sociologist and academic
  1938   – Werner Olk, German footballer and manager
  1938   – Hargus "Pig" Robbins, American Country Music Hall of Fame session keyboard and piano player (d. 2022)
1940 – Pedro Rodriguez, Mexican race car driver (d. 1971)
1941 – Denise Bombardier, Canadian journalist and author
  1941   – Bobby Goldsboro, American singer-songwriter, guitarist, and producer
  1941   – David Ruffin, American singer (d. 1991)
1943 – Paul Freeman, English actor
  1943   – Kay Granger, American educator and politician
  1943   – Dave Greenslade, English keyboard player and composer
  1943   – Charlie Wilson, American businessman and politician (d. 2013)
1944 – Paul Keating, Australian economist and politician, 24th Prime Minister of Australia
  1944   – Carl Morton, American baseball player (d. 1983)
  1944   – Kei Ogura, Japanese singer-songwriter and composer
  1944   – Alexander Van der Bellen, President of Austria
1945 – Rocco Forte, English businessman and philanthropist
1946 – Perro Aguayo, Mexican wrestler (d. 2019)
  1946   – Joseph Deiss, Swiss economist and politician, 156th President of the Swiss Confederation
  1946   – Henrique Rosa, Bissau-Guinean politician, President of Guinea-Bissau (d. 2013)
1947 – Sachio Kinugasa, Japanese baseball player and journalist (d. 2018)
  1947   – Takeshi Kitano, Japanese actor and director
1949 – Bill Keller, American journalist
  1949   – Philippe Starck, French interior designer
1950 – Gianfranco Brancatelli, Italian race car driver
  1950   – Gilles Villeneuve, Canadian race car driver (d. 1982)
1951 – Bram Behr, Surinamese journalist and activist (d. 1982)
  1951   – Bob Latchford, English footballer
1952 – Michael Behe, American biochemist, author, and academic
  1952   – R. Stevie Moore, American singer-songwriter and guitarist
1953 – B. K. Misra, Indian neurosurgeon 
  1953   – Peter Moon, Australian comedian and actor
  1953   – Brett Hudson, American singer-songwriter and producer
1955 – Kevin Costner, American actor, director, and producer
1956 – Paul Deighton, Baron Deighton, English banker and politician
1960 – Mark Rylance, English actor, director, and playwright
1961 – Peter Beardsley, English footballer and manager
  1961   – Bob Hansen, American basketball player and sportscaster
  1961   – Mark Messier, Canadian ice hockey player, coach, and sportscaster
  1961   – Jeff Yagher, American actor and sculptor
1962 – Alison Arngrim, Canadian-American actress
1963 – Maxime Bernier, Canadian lawyer and politician, 7th Minister of Foreign Affairs for Canada
  1963   – Ian Crook, English footballer and manager
  1963   – Carl McCoy, English singer-songwriter
  1963   – Martin O'Malley, American soldier, lawyer, and politician, 61st Governor of Maryland
1964 – Brady Anderson, American baseball player
  1964   – Richard Dunwoody, Northern Irish jockey and sportscaster
  1964   – Virgil Hill, American boxer
  1964   – Jane Horrocks, English actress and singer
1966 – Alexander Khalifman, Russian chess player and author
  1966   – Kazufumi Miyazawa, Japanese singer
  1966   – André Ribeiro, Brazilian race car driver
1967 – Dean Bailey, Australian footballer and coach (d. 2014)
  1967   – Iván Zamorano, Chilean footballer
1969 – Dave Bautista, American wrestler, mixed martial artist, and actor
  1969   – Jesse L. Martin, American actor and singer
  1969   – Jim O'Rourke, American guitarist and producer
1970 – Peter Van Petegem, Belgian cyclist
1971 – Amy Barger, American astronomer
  1971   – Jonathan Davis, American singer-songwriter
  1971   – Christian Fittipaldi, Brazilian race car driver
  1971   – Pep Guardiola, Spanish footballer and manager
  1971   – Binyavanga Wainaina, Kenyan writer (d. 2019)
1972 – Vinod Kambli, Indian cricketer, sportscaster, and actor
  1972   – Mike Lieberthal, American baseball player
  1972   – Kjersti Plätzer, Norwegian race walker
1973 – Burnie Burns, American actor, director, and producer, co-founded Rooster Teeth Productions
  1973   – Luke Goodwin, Australian rugby league player and coach
  1973   – Benjamin Jealous, American civic leader and activist
  1973   – Joe Kehoskie, American baseball executive
  1973   – Anthony Koutoufides, Australian footballer
  1973   – Crispian Mills, English singer-songwriter, guitarist, and director
  1973   – Rolando Schiavi, Argentinian footballer and coach
1974 – Christian Burns, English singer-songwriter
1976 – Laurence Courtois, Belgian tennis player
  1976   – Marcelo Gallardo, Argentinian footballer and coach
  1976   – Damien Leith, Irish-Australian singer-songwriter and guitarist
  1976   – Derek Richardson, American actor
1977 – Richard Archer, English singer-songwriter and guitarist
1978 – Brian Falkenborg, American baseball player
  1978   – Thor Hushovd, Norwegian cyclist
  1978   – Bogdan Lobonț, Romanian footballer
1979 – Ruslan Fedotenko, Ukrainian ice hockey player
  1979   – Paulo Ferreira, Portuguese footballer
  1979   – Brian Gionta, American ice hockey player
  1979   – Kenyatta Jones, American football player (d. 2018)
  1979   – Wandy Rodriguez, Dominican baseball player
1980 – Estelle, English singer-songwriter and producer
  1980   – Robert Green, English footballer
  1980   – Kert Haavistu, Estonian footballer and manager
  1980   – Julius Peppers, American football player
  1980   – Jason Segel, American actor and screenwriter
1981 – Olivier Rochus, Belgian tennis player
  1981   – Khari Stephenson, Jamaican footballer
  1981   – Kang Dong-won, South Korean actor
1982 – Quinn Allman, American guitarist and producer
  1982   – Mary Jepkosgei Keitany, Kenyan runner
1983 – Amir Blumenfeld, Israeli-American comedian, actor, director, and screenwriter
  1983   – Samantha Mumba, Irish singer-songwriter and actress
1984 – Kristy Lee Cook, American singer-songwriter
  1984   – Ioannis Drymonakos, Greek swimmer
  1984   – Makoto Hasebe, Japanese footballer
  1984   – Michael Kearney, American biochemist and academic
  1984   – Seung-Hui Cho, South Korean student who perpetrated the 2007 mass shooting at Virginia Tech (d. 2007)
  1984   – Benji Schwimmer, American dancer and choreographer
  1984   – Viktoria Shklover, Estonian figure skater
1985 – Dale Begg-Smith, Canadian-Australian skier
  1985   – Mark Briscoe, American wrestler
  1985   – Riccardo Montolivo, Italian footballer
  1985   – Hyun Woo, South Korean actor
1986 – Marya Roxx, Estonian-American singer-songwriter
  1986   – Ikusaburo Yamazaki, Japanese actor and singer
  1986   – Eugene Lee Yang, Korean-American actor, filmmaker, and activist
1987 – Johan Djourou, Swiss footballer
  1987   – Christopher Liebig, German rugby player
  1987   – Grigoris Makos, Greek footballer
1988 – Ronnie Day, American singer-songwriter
  1988   – Angelique Kerber, German tennis player
  1988   – Anastasios Kissas, Greek footballer
  1988   – Ashleigh Murray, American actress and singer
  1988   – Boy van Poppel, Dutch cyclist
1989 – Rubén Miño, Spanish footballer
  1989   – Michael Pineda, Dominican baseball player
1990 – Nacho, Spanish footballer
  1990   – Hayle Ibrahimov, Ethiopian-Azerbaijani runner
  1990   – Brett Lawrie, Canadian baseball player
  1990   – Gift Ngoepe, South African baseball player
  1990   – Zeeko Zaki, Egyptian-born American actor
1991 – Diego Simões, Brazilian footballer
1992 – Francesco Bardi, Italian footballer
1993 – Sean Keenan, Australian actor
1994 – Max Fried, American baseball player
  1994   – Kang Ji-young, South Korean singer
  1994   – Ilona Kremen, Belarusian tennis player
1995 – Bryce Alford, American basketball player
  1995   – Leonard Fournette, American football player
1998 – Aitana Bonmatí, Spanish footballer
1999 – Tee Higgins, American football player
  1999   – Mateus Ward, American actor
2002 – Anastasia Zakharova, Russian tennis player

Deaths

Pre-1600
52 BC – Publius Clodius Pulcher, Roman politician (b. 93 BC)
 474 – Leo I, Byzantine emperor (b. 401)
 748 – Odilo, duke of Bavaria
 896 – Khumarawayh ibn Ahmad ibn Tulun, ruler of the Tulunids, murdered (b. 864)
1213 – Tamar of Georgia (b. 1160)
1253 – King Henry I of Cyprus (b. 1217)
1271 – Saint Margaret of Hungary (b. 1242)
1326 – Robert FitzWalter, 1st Baron FitzWalter, English baron (b. 1247)
1357 – Maria of Portugal, infanta (b. 1313)
1367 – Peter I of Portugal (b. 1320)
1411 – Jobst of Moravia, ruler of Moravia, King of the Romans
1425 – Edmund Mortimer, 5th Earl of March, English politician (b. 1391)
1451 – Henry II, Count of Nassau-Siegen (1442–1451) (b. 1414)
1471 – Emperor Go-Hanazono of Japan (b. 1419)
1479 – Louis IX, Duke of Bavaria (b. 1417)
1547 – Pietro Bembo, Italian cardinal and scholar (b. 1470)
1586 – Margaret of Parma (b. 1522)
1589 – Magnus Heinason, Faroese naval hero (b. 1545)

1601–1900
1677 – Jan van Riebeeck, Dutch politician, founded Cape Town (b. 1619)
1756 – Francis George of Schönborn-Buchheim, Archbishop-Elector of Trier (b. 1682)
1783 – Jeanne Quinault, French actress and playwright (b. 1699)
1803 – Ippolit Bogdanovich, Russian poet and academic (b. 1743)
1849 – Panoutsos Notaras, Greek politician (b. 1752)
1862 – John Tyler, American soldier, lawyer, and politician, 10th President of the United States (b. 1790)
1873 – Edward Bulwer-Lytton, English author, poet, playwright, and politician, Secretary of State for the Colonies (b. 1803)
1878 – Antoine César Becquerel, French physicist and academic (b. 1788)
1886 – Baldassare Verazzi, Italian painter (b. 1819)
1892 – Anton Anderledy, Swiss religious leader, 23rd Superior General of the Society of Jesus (b. 1819)
1896 – Charles Floquet, French lawyer and politician, 55th Prime Minister of France (b. 1828)

1901–present
1923 – Wallace Reid, American actor, director, and screenwriter (b. 1891)
1936 – Hermanus Brockmann, Dutch rower (b. 1871)
  1936   – Rudyard Kipling, English author and poet, Nobel Prize laureate (b. 1865)
1940 – Kazimierz Przerwa-Tetmajer, Polish author, poet, and playwright (b. 1865)
1951 – Amy Carmichael, Irish missionary and humanitarian (b. 1867)
1952 – Curly Howard, American actor (b. 1903)
1954 – Sydney Greenstreet, English-American actor (b. 1879)
1955 – Saadat Hasan Manto, Pakistani author and screenwriter (b. 1912)
1956 – Makbule Atadan, Turkish lawyer and politician (b. 1885)
  1956   – Konstantin Päts, Estonian journalist, lawyer, and politician, 1st President of Estonia (b. 1874)
1963 – Hugh Gaitskell, English academic and politician, Chancellor of the Exchequer (b. 1906)
1966 – Kathleen Norris, American journalist and author (b. 1880)
1967 – Goose Tatum, American basketball player and soldier (b. 1921)
1969 – Hans Freyer, German sociologist and philosopher (b. 1887)
1970 – David O. McKay, American religious leader, 9th President of The Church of Jesus Christ of Latter-day Saints (b. 1873)
1971 – Virgil Finlay, American illustrator (b. 1914)
1973 – Irina Nikolaevna Levchenko, Russian tank commander (b. 1924)
1975 – Gertrude Olmstead, American actress (b. 1897)
1978 – Hasan Askari, Pakistani philosopher and author (b. 1919)
1980 – Cecil Beaton, English fashion designer and photographer (b. 1904)
1984 – Panteleimon Ponomarenko, Belarusian general and politician (b. 1902)
  1984   – Vassilis Tsitsanis, Greek singer-songwriter and bouzouki player (b. 1915)
1989 – Bruce Chatwin, English-French author (b. 1940)
1990 – Melanie Appleby, English singer (b. 1966)
  1990   – Rusty Hamer, American actor (b. 1947)
1993 – Dionysios Zakythinos, Greek historian, academic, and politician (b. 1905)
1995 – Adolf Butenandt, German biochemist and academic, Nobel Prize laureate (b. 1903)
  1995   – Ron Luciano, American baseball player and umpire (b. 1937)
1996 – N. T. Rama Rao, Indian actor, director, producer, and politician, 10th Chief Minister of Andhra Pradesh (b. 1923)
1997 – Paul Tsongas, American lawyer and politician (b. 1941)
1998 – Dan Georgiadis, Greek footballer and manager (b. 1922)
2000 – Margarete Schütte-Lihotzky, Austrian architect (b. 1897)
2001 – Laurent-Désiré Kabila, President of the Democratic Republic of the Congo (b. 1939)
2003 – Ed Farhat, American wrestler and trainer (b. 1924)
  2003   – Harivansh Rai Bachchan, Indian poet and author (b. 1907)
2004 – Galina Gavrilovna Korchuganova, Russian-born Soviet test pilot and aerobatics champion (b. 1935)
2005 – Lamont Bentley, American actor and rapper (b. 1973)
2006 – Jan Twardowski, Polish priest and poet (b. 1915)
2007 – Brent Liles, American bass player (b. 1963)
2008 – Georgia Frontiere, American businesswoman and philanthropist (b. 1927)
  2008   – Frank Lewin, American composer and theorist (b. 1925)
  2008   – Lois Nettleton, American actress (b. 1927)
  2008   – John Stroger, American politician (b. 1929)
2009 – Tony Hart, English painter and television host (b. 1925)
  2009   – Nora Kovach, Hungarian-American ballerina (b. 1931)
  2009   – Danai Stratigopoulou, Greek singer-songwriter (b. 1913)
  2009   – Grigore Vieru, Romanian poet and author (b. 1935)
2010 – Kate McGarrigle, Canadian musician and singer-songwriter (b. 1946)
  2010   – Robert B. Parker, American author and academic (b. 1932)
2011 – Sargent Shriver, American politician and diplomat, 21st United States Ambassador to France (b. 1915)
2012 – Anthony Gonsalves, Indian composer and educator (b. 1927)
  2012   – Georg Lassen, German captain (b. 1915)
  2012   – Yuri Rasovsky, American playwright and producer, founded The National Radio Theater of Chicago (b. 1944)
2013 – Sean Fallon, Irish footballer and manager (b. 1922)
  2013   – Jim Horning, American computer scientist and academic (b. 1942)
  2013   – Jon Mannah, Australian rugby league player (b. 1989)
  2013   – Lewis Marnell, Australian skateboarder (b. 1982)
  2013   – Ron Nachman, Israeli lawyer and politician (b. 1942)
2014 – Kathryn Abbe, American photographer and author (b. 1919)
  2014   – Michael Botmang, Nigerian politician, 17th Governor of Plateau State (b. 1938)
  2014   – Dennis Frederiksen, American singer-songwriter (b. 1951)
  2014   – Andy Graver, English footballer (b. 1927)
  2014   – Sarah Marshall, English actress (b. 1933)
  2014   – Eugenio Cruz Vargas, Chilean poet and painter (b. 1923)
2015 – Alberto Nisman, Argentinian lawyer and prosecutor (b. 1963)
  2015   – Christine Valmy, Romanian cosmetologist and author (b. 1926)
  2015   – Piet van der Sanden, Dutch journalist and politician (b. 1924)
  2015   – Tony Verna, American director and producer, invented instant replay (b. 1933)
2016 – Johnny Bach, American basketball player and coach (b. 1924)
  2016   – Glenn Frey, American singer-songwriter, guitarist, and actor (b. 1948)
  2016   – T. S. Sinnathuray, Judge of the High Court of Singapore (b. 1930)
  2016   – Michel Tournier, French journalist and author (b. 1924)
2017 – Peter Abrahams, South African-Jamaican writer (b. 1919)
  2017   – David P. Buckson, American lawyer and politician, Governor of Delaware  (b. 1920)
  2017   – Rachael Heyhoe Flint, Baroness Heyhoe Flint, English cricketer, businesswoman and philanthropist (b. 1939)
  2017   – Roberta Peters, American coloratura soprano (b. 1930)
2019 – John Coughlin, American figure skater (b. 1985)
2022 – Francisco Gento, Spanish football player (b. 1933)
  2022   – Yvette Mimieux, American actress (b. 1942)
  2022   – André Leon Talley, American fashion journalist (b. 1948) 
  2023   – David Crosby, American singer-songwriter (b. 1941)

Holidays and observances
Christian feast day:
Amy Carmichael (Church of England)
Athanasius of Alexandria (Eastern Orthodox Church)
Confession of Peter (Eastern Orthodox, some Anglican and Lutheran Churches)
Cyril of Alexandria
Deicolus
Margaret of Hungary
Prisca
Volusianus of Tours
January 18 (Eastern Orthodox liturgics)
Royal Thai Armed Forces Day (Thailand)

References

External links

 BBC: On This Day
 
 Historical Events on January 18

Days of the year
January